One Down, Two to Go may refer to:

Film
 One Down, Two to Go, a 1982 American film directed by and starring Fred Williamson

Television
 "One Down, Two to Go" (Married... with Children), an episode of the American TV series Married... with Children

Music
 "Enuff Is Enuff (Theme From The Movie "One Down, Two To Go")", the B-side of the 1982 single "Enuff Is Enuff" by the American composer Rodney Franklin
 Mr. Right & Mr. Wrong: One Down & Two to Go, a 1994 compilation album by the Canadian band Nomeansno
 "One Down Two to Go", a song by the Danish band King Diamond from their 1998 album Voodoo

See also
 Monty Python Live (Mostly): One Down, Five to Go, a 2014 live special by Monty Python